Domanice may refer to the following places in Poland:
Domanice, Wołów County in Lower Silesian Voivodeship (south-west Poland)
Domanice, Wrocław County in Lower Silesian Voivodeship (south-west Poland)
Domanice, Masovian Voivodeship (east-central Poland)
Domanice, Greater Poland Voivodeship (west-central Poland)
Domanice, Bytów County in Pomeranian Voivodeship (north Poland)
Domanice, Słupsk County in Pomeranian Voivodeship (north Poland)